The Benjamarachalai School is a schoolhouse situated in the old palace of the Prince Marubongsa Siribadhana, half-brother of King Rama V, in Bangkok, Thailand. Siripat built the school in honor of King Rama V.

The school has since constructed four new buildings to replace the old, wooden one. It is currently a girls' school teaching students in grades 7-12. It offers art, science, math, and foreign language study.

References

 Schools in Thailand